Beyond the Shrouded Horizon is the twenty-first studio album by English guitarist and songwriter Steve Hackett.

Background and recording
"Loch Lomond" is named after the loch of the same name in Scotland. Hackett described the track as blues-influenced which changes to European music once the strings are heard. The lyrics contain many contradictory images, such as a hummingbird in the snow. Though the song contains what sound like bagpipes, Hackett revealed that the sound is in fact a mix of bagpipe samples and a saxophone with the reed "turned around the other way".

Track listing
"Loch Lomond" (Steve Hackett, Jo Hackett, Roger King) – 6:50
"The Phoenix Flown" (Steve Hackett, Jo Hackett, King) – 2:08
"Wanderlust" (Steve Hackett, Jo Hackett, King) – 0:44
"Til These Eyes" (Steve Hackett, Jo Hackett, King) – 2:41
"Prairie Angel" (Steve Hackett, Jo Hackett, Steve Howe, Jonathan Mover) – 2:59
"A Place Called Freedom" (Steve Hackett, Jo Hackett, King) – 5:57
"Between the Sunset and the Coconut Palms" (Steve Hackett, Jo Hackett, King) – 3:18
"Waking to Life" (Steve Hackett, Jo Hackett, King) – 4:50
"Two Faces of Cairo" (Steve Hackett, Jo Hackett, King) – 5:13
"Looking for Fantasy" (Steve Hackett, Jo Hackett, King) – 4:33
"Summer's Breath" (Steve Hackett, Jo Hackett, King) – 1:12
"Catwalk" (Steve Hackett, Jo Hackett, King) – 5:44
"Turn This Island Earth" (Steve Hackett, Jo Hackett, Steve Howe, Roger King, Jonathan Mover) – 11:51

Bonus CD (limited special edition only)
"Four Winds: North" (Steve Hackett, King) – 1:35
"Four Winds: South" (Steve Hackett, King) – 2:06
"Four Winds: East" (Steve Hackett, Fenner) – 3:34 (previously appeared on Japan edition of Darktown as "The Well at the World's End")
"Four Winds: West" (Steve Hackett, King) – 3:04 (previously appeared on Marco Lo Muscio's The Book of Bilbo and Gandalf as "Galadriel")
"Pieds En L'Air" (Peter Warlock) – 2:26
"She Said Maybe" (Steve Hackett, King) – 4:21
"Enter the Night" (Steve Hackett, Jo Hackett, King) – 4:00 (vocal version of "Depth Charge," aka "Riding the Colossus," from various previous albums)
"Eruption: Tommy" (Thijs van Leer) – 3:37 (previously appeared on Japan edition of Wild Orchids)
"Reconditioned Nightmare" (Hackett) – 4:06 (previously appeared on Japan edition of Wild Orchids)

Personnel
Normal release
Steve Hackett – guitars, vocals, harmonica (1–13)
Nick Beggs – bass, chapman stick, pink ukulele (1, 6)
Dick Driver – double bass (4, 7, 10, 13)
John Hackett – flute (9) vocals (7)
Roger King – keyboards, programming (1–13)
Amanda Lehmann – vocals (1, 6, 8) guitar (5, 6)
Gary O'Toole – drums (1, 2, 5, 8, 9) vocals (1, 6,)
Simon Phillips – drums (12, 13)
Chris Squire – bass (10, 12, 13)
Richard Stewart – cello (4, 7, 9, 10)
Christine Townsend – violin, viola (4, 7, 9, 10)
Rob Townsend – saxophone, whistle, bass clarinet (1, 4, 5, 6, 8)

Bonus CD
Steve Hackett – guitars, vocals (1–4, 6–9)
Dick Driver – double bass (5)
Benedict Fenner – keyboards, programming (3)
Roger King – keyboards, programming (1, 2, 6–9)
Amanda Lehmann – vocals (7)
Gary O'Toole – drums, vocals (7)
Simon Phillips – drums (1)
Chris Squire – bass (1, 7)
Richard Stewart – cello (5)
Christine Townsend – violin, viola (5)
Cover photo 
Harry Pearce

References

External links
Official site

2011 albums
Steve Hackett albums
Century Media Records albums
Inside Out Music albums